The Apertura 2016 Liga MX championship stage commonly known as liguilla (mini league) was being played from November 23 to December 25. A total of eight teams were competing in the championship stage to decide the champions of the Apertura 2016 Liga MX season. Both finalists qualified to the 2018 CONCACAF Champions League.

Qualified teams

Format
Teams are re-seeded each round.
Team with more goals on aggregate after two matches advances.
Away goals rule is applied in the quarterfinals and semifinals, but not the final.
In the quarterfinals and semifinals, if the two teams are tied on aggregate and away goals, the higher seeded team advances.
In the final, if the two teams are tied after both legs, the match goes to extra time and, if necessary, a shoot-out.
Both finalists qualify to the 2018 CONCACAF Champions League (in Pot 3).

Bracket

Quarterfinals

All times are UTC−6 except for match in Tijuana

First leg

Second leg

UANL won 7–2 on aggregate.

León won 5–3 on aggregate.

América won 2–1 on aggregate.

Necaxa won 2–1 on aggregate.

Semifinals

All times are UTC−6

First leg

Second leg

UANL won 3–1 on aggregate.

América won 3–1 on aggregate.

Finals

All times are UTC−6

First leg

Assistant referees:
Marvin Torrentera (Mexico City)
Andres Hernández Delgado (Mexico City)
Fourth official:
Erick Yair Miranda (Guanajuato)

Second leg

2–2 on aggregate. UANL won 3–0 on penalty kicks.

Assistant referees:
Juan Joel Rangel (Mexico City)
Mario Jesús López (Durango)
Fourth official:
Fernando Guerrero (Mexico City)

Goalscorers
6 goals
 André-Pierre Gignac (UANL)

3 goals
 William (América)

2 goals
 Mauro Boselli (León)
 Felipe Gallegos (Necaxa)
 Luis Montes (León)
 Oribe Peralta (América)

1 goal
 Edson Álvarez (América)
 Pablo Barrera (UNAM)
 Germán Cano (León)
 Yasser Corona (Tijuana)
 Jürgen Damm (UANL)
 Andy Delort (UANL)
 Jesús Dueñas (UANL)
 Víctor Guzmán (Pachuca)
 Fidel Martínez (UNAM)
 Dayro Moreno (Tijuana)
 Fernando Navarro (León)
 Claudio Riaño (Necaxa)
 Guido Rodríguez (Tijuana)
 Carlos Salcido (Guadalajara)
 Ismael Sosa (UANL)
 Bruno Valdez (América)
 Lucas Zelarrayán (UANL)

Own goals
 Darío Verón (for UANL)

References

 
1
Liga MX seasons